Białe Jezioro  literally means "White Lake" in Polish.

Białe Jezioro may refer to:
 Białe Jezioro, Bydgoszcz County, a lake in Kuyavian-Pomeranian Voivodeship, Bydgoszcz County
 Białe Jezioro, Tuchola County, a lake in Kuyavian-Pomeranian Voivodeship, Tuchola County
 Białe Jezioro, Bytów County, a lake in Pomeranian Voivodship, Bytów County
 Białe Jezioro, Gmina Przechlewo, a lake in Pomeranian Voivodeship, Człuchów County
 Białe Jezioro, Gmina Chmielno, a lake in Pomeranian Voivodeship, Kartuzy County
 Białe Jezioro, Gmina Kartuzy, a lake in Pomeranian Voivodeship, Kartuzy County
 Białe Jezioro, Gmina Sierakowice, a lake in Pomeranian Voivodeship, Kartuzy County
 Białe Jezioro, Kościerzyna County, a lake in Pomeranian Voivodeship, Kościerzyna County
 Białe Jezioro, Kwidzyn County, a lake in Pomeranian Voivodeship, Kwidzyn County
 Białe Jezioro, Sztum County, a lake in Pomeranian Voivodeship, Sztum County
 Białe Jezioro, Wejherowo County, a lake in Pomeranian Voivodeship, Wejherowo County
 Białe Jezioro, Olsztyn County, a lake in Warmian-Masurian Voivodeship, Olsztyn County
 Białe Jezioro, Węgorzewo County, a lake in Warmian-Masurian Voivodeship, Węgorzewo County
 Białe Jezioro, Chodzież County, a lake in Great Poland Voivodship, Chodzież County
 Białe Jezioro, Czarnków-Trzcianka County, a reservoir in Great Poland Voivodship, Czarnków-Trzcianka County
 Białe Jezioro, Gniezno County, a lake in Great Poland Voivodship, Gniezno County
 Białe Jezioro, West Pomeranian Voivodship, a lake in West Pomeranian Voivodeship, in Szczecinek County

See also 
 Jezioro Białe (disambiguation)